Kōnane is a two-player strategy board game from Hawaii. It was invented by the ancient Hawaiian Polynesians. The game is played on a rectangular board.  It begins with black and white counters filling the board in an alternating pattern. Players then hop over one another's pieces, capturing them similar to checkers. The first player unable to capture is the loser; their opponent is the winner.

Before contact with Europeans, the game was played using small pieces of white coral and black lava on a large carved rock which doubled as both board and table. The Puʻuhonua o Hōnaunau National Historical Park has one of these stone gameboards on its premises.
   
The game is somewhat similar to draughts. Pieces hop over one another when capturing; however, the similarities end there.  In draughts, one player's pieces are initially set up on one side of the board opposite the other player's pieces. In Kōnane, both players' pieces are intermixed in a checkered pattern of black and white occupying every square of the board. Furthermore, in Kōnane all moves are capturing moves, captures are made in an orthogonal direction (not diagonally), and in a multiple-capture move the capturing piece may not change direction.

Kōnane has some resemblances to the games of Leap Frog, and Main Chuki or Tjuki.  In both Kōnane and Leap Frog, every square of the board is occupied by a playing piece in the beginning of the game, and the only legal moves (after the first turn) are orthogonal captures by the short leap method.  However, there are significant differences in Kōnane and Leap Frog.

Equipment 

The game is played on a rectangular or square board. Pieces can be laid out in the beginning of the game in an alternating checkerboard pattern of two colors on top of a table, on the ground, or on any flat surface.  Furthermore, the game can be generalized to any size geometrically. In practice, square Kōnane boards can range from 6×6 to over 14×14. Traditional rectangular board dimensions include 9×13, 14×17, and 13×20.

Goal 
The first player unable to capture an enemy piece is the loser, and the other player is the winner.

Rules and gameplay 
The game begins with all the pieces on the board (or table, ground, etc.) arranged in an alternating pattern. Players decide which colors to play (black or white).  
 Black traditionally starts first and must remove one of his pieces either from the middle of the board, where there are 2 black and 2 white pieces that are diagonally opposite each other. Or remove a black piece from one of the four corners of the board (which will also consist of 2 black and 2 white pieces diagonally opposite from each other).
 White then removes one of his pieces orthogonally adjacent to the empty space created by Black.  There are now two orthogonally adjacent empty spaces on the board. 
 From here on, players take turns capturing each other's pieces.  All moves must be capturing moves.  A player captures an enemy piece by hopping over it with their own piece similar to draughts; however, unlike draughts, captures can be done only orthogonally and not diagonally.  The player's piece hops over the orthogonally adjacent enemy piece, and lands on a vacant space immediately beyond. The player's piece can continue to hop over enemy pieces but only in the same orthogonal direction.  The player can stop hopping enemy pieces at any time, but must at least capture one enemy piece in a turn.  After the piece has stopped hopping, the player's turn ends.  Only one piece may be used in a turn to capture enemy pieces.
          
The player unable to make a capture is the loser; his opponent is the winner. It is impossible to draw in Kōnane, because one player eventually cannot perform a capture.

Mathematical analysis

Hearn proved that Kōnane is PSPACE-complete with respect to the dimensions of the board, by a reduction from Constraint Logic. There have been some positive results for restricted configurations. Ernst derives Combinatorial-Game-Theoretic values for several interesting positions. Chan and Tsai analyze the 1 × n game, but even this version of the game is not yet solved.

Other conversions 
Brainvita, also called Peg Solitaire, is a game for one person, in which the rules of Kōnane are used to move clockwise in turns. The procedure and aim of the game are identical to the original.

References

Further reading

External links
Konane: Hawaiian Checker game Gail Kaapuni, Waiakeawaena and Kalanianaole Elementary Schools, Hawaii

Abstract strategy games
Hawaii culture